Mac Wright may refer to :

 Mac Wright (cricketer) (born 1998), Australian cricketer
 Mack V. Wright (1894–1965), American actor and film director

See also
Max Wright, American actor